Cavalese cable car disaster may refer to:

 Cavalese cable car disaster (1976)
 Cavalese cable car disaster (1998)